Svengali is the second studio album by New York rapper Cakes da Killa. It was released on October 28, 2022 through Young Art Records. Cakes da Killa composed the album with Sam Katz and Joshua McCormick.

Background 
Cakes da Killa writes about dating in New York City through the lens of a svengali, a person who seduces and manipulates others. In an interview with Them, Cakes explains that, while in relationships, he has had to deduce whether he is dating a svengali or if he is acting like one.

The album was originally ready for release in early 2020 but was delayed with the advent of the COVID-19 pandemic. In an interview with Flood magazine, Cakes da Killa shares that the project is about love and draws parallels between relationships between lovers, fans, and music more generally. The album includes interludes that Cakes says are real messages from suitors.

Critical reception 

Svengali was released to generally positive reviews from critics. Pitchfork writer Dylan Green called the album "...a smooth balance of anxiety and aggression, love and lust, confidence and vulnerability." Tara Joshi wrote for The Observer that Svengali is a "sleek, enticing record that certifies Cakes da Killa’s place at the forefront of this sound". Mercy Kassa from Bandcamp Daily said: "Cakes provides a recipe for dancing through both love hangovers and love burnouts".

Track listing

References

External links 
 Svengali on Spotify

2022 albums
Hip hop albums
Hip hop albums by American artists